Events in the year 1837 in India.

Incumbents
The Earl of Auckland, Governor-General, 1836-42.
Alexander Cunningham, aide-de-camp to Lord Auckland, 1836-1840
Sir John Keane, Lieutenant-General of the Bombay Army, 1834-1840
Zirat Prasad, regent of Bhaisunda, 1829-1840
Raghuji Bohonsle III, Maratha of Nagpur, 1818-1853
Gaya Prasad, Chaube of Taraon State, 1812-1840
Anand Rao Puar "Rao Sahib", Raja of Dewas State, 1817-1840
Dariao Singh, Rao of Paldeo, 1812-1840
Shiv Saran Singh, Rana of Baghal State, 1828-16 January 1840
Jashwant Singh, Raja of Nabha State, December 1783-21 May 1840
Kandhaji IV, Thakur Sahib of Palitana State, 1820-1840
Nonghanji IV, Thakur Sahib of Palitana State, 1824-1860

Events
First Anglo-Afghan War, 1837-1842
Jessop & Company complete construction of the first iron bridge in British India, Loha-ka-Pul over River Gomti at Lucknow, 1812-1840

Law
Native Emigrants Act
Custom House Act

Births
Herbert Mills Birdwood, Governor of Bombay, born in Belgaum
Valentine Bambrick, recipient of the Victorian Cross, born on 13 April 1837 in Cawnpore

References

 
India
Years of the 19th century in India